The 2006 Dublin Senior Football Championship was an edition of an annual Gaelic football competition organized by the Dublin County Board of the Gaelic Athletic Association in Ireland. The competition used a modified knockout format. The previous champions in 2005 were Kilmacud Crokes, who were knocked out of the 2006 competition at the semi-final stage. UCD finished the 2006 championship as Dublin champions, by beating St Vincents in the final.

Rounds 1-4

Round 1

The winners of their respective first-round games went on to qualify for the second round, the losers were given a second chance in a backdoor system which gave them a place in the third round when they won their backdoor tie.

Round 2

Structure
All teams in Round two who lost in the first round were drawn against each other in the second round in a phase known as the second round backdoor system. The losers of these backdoor games were knocked out of the championship and went on to play in the relegation playoffs. The winning teams from round one were paired with each other. The losers of these round two games progressed to the third round and the winning teams skipped a round and went on directly to the fourth round.

The Games
The most notable fixture in this round was the defeat of Kilmacud Crokes by Round Towers. This made it more difficult for Kilmacud to retain their title, Kilmacud went straight to round 3 and Round Towers progressed to Round 4. Also, St Vincents and St Oliver Plunketts were forced to a replay. The replay saw the return of Alan Brogan to Dublin football after a few months on the sidelines. St Oliver Plunketts progressed to the fourth round and St Vincents had a tie against Parnells in the third round.

St Oliver Plunketts/Eoghan Ruadh, Ballymun Kickhams, UCD, Raheny, St Judes, St Brigids A, Ballyboden St Endas progressed to the fourth round as they won their respective second-round games and hadn't lost a game so far in the championship.

St Vincents, St Sylvesters, Lucan Sarsfields, Ballinteer St Johns, St Marks Naomh Mearnóg, Kilmacud Crokes and Erins Isle progressed to the third round despite losing their games as they were a winning team in the first round.

Thomas Davis, Parnells, O'Tooles, Garda, Na Fianna, Naomh Olaf, St Marys and St Annes progressed to the third round as they won their respective second round ties.

St Brigids 'B', Erins Hope, Whitehall Colmcille, Trinity Gaels, Clontarf, Naomh Barróg, Fingallians and St Maurs went on play to retain their senior status in the relegation section.

Round 3

Structure
This draw was restricted by a rule that did not allow two clubs who have met earlier in the championship to meet again. Therefore, there was no chance of a repeat of a previous encounter. Round 3 consisted of sixteen teams: the eight losers from Round 2 plus the eight winners from the backdoor system. So it was eight games and the eight winners progressed to Round 4.

St Vincents, Erins Isle, Na Fianna, O'Tooles, St Marys, Ballinteer St Johns, Lucan Sarsfields and Kilmacud Crokes progressed to the fourth round having won their respective games.

Parnells, Garda, Naomh Mearnóg, St Sylvesters, St Marks, St Annes, Thomas Davis, and Naomh Olaf were knocked out of the competition for 2006, although they retained their senior status for the 2007 Dublin Senior Club Football Championship.

Round 4
The draw for the fourth round or the last 16 took place on 15 August. The draw was from the second-round winners - St Brigid's, UCD, Ballyboden St Enda's, St Judes, Raheny, St Oliver Plunkett's/Eoghan Ruadh, Round Towers Clondalkin and Ballymun Kickhams and the third-round winners - Kilmacud Crokes, Ballinteer St John's, St Vincent's, Na Fianna, O'Toole's, Erin's Isle, Lucan Sarsfields and St Mary's. The winners of the second round were drawn against the third-round winners; they were separated by two distinct lots meaning the second-round winners were kept apart from third-round winners in the fourth-round draw. The draw revealed a potential tie of the round between champions Kilmacud Crokes and Ballyboden St Endas.

Round four saw the exit of Erin's Isle, Ballinteer St John's, Ballyboden St Endas, Ballymun Kickhams, Raheny, O'Tooles, St Marys and St Brigids.

St Vincent's, Round Towers(Clondalkin), St Oliver Plunketts/Eoghan Ruadh, Na Fianna, Lucan Sarsfields, St Judes, UCD and tournament favourites Kilmacud Crokes progressed to the last eight.

Quarterfinals
The quarter finals saw the exit of Lucan Sarsfields, St Judes, St Oliver Plunketts and Round Towers of Clondalkin. St Vincents, UCD, Na Fianna and the tournament favourites Kilmacud Crokes went on to the semi-finals. The quarter finals saw the first round in the competition so far to have had no drawn matches.

Semi-final
The Dublin senior club football championship did not go ahead on the original 12 October date, due to an appeal by St Oliver Plunketts/Eoghan Ruadh and Kilmacud Crokes.

A decision on the dates was to be decided pending the results of Plunkett's appeal which was to be heard by the Dublin GAC on 13 October.

The Leinster council had given an extra week for the Dublin GAC to sort the issues. If the problems were not sorted in time, Dublin would not have a representative in the Leinster Senior Club Football Championship for the 2006/07 season.

Na Fianna V St Oliver Plunketts/Eoghan Ruadh dispute
St Oliver Plunkett's/Eoghan Ruadh had lodged a complaint objecting to the eligibility of Na Fianna's former Mayo player Gary Mullins, who took part in the quarter final clash between the two teams.

St Oliver Plunkett's lost their appeal to the Dublin County Board, therefore the Dublin GAC set the fixture of Na Fianna against St Vincents as originally planned.

St Oliver Plunkett's, however, took their appeal to the Leinster Council in hope of being re-instated into the Dublin Championship. This further delayed the Dublin Championship and raised the possibility of the championship not being completed in time for Dublin to produce a representative in the Leinster championship. The Leinster council ruled in favour of the Dublin GAC and the semi final was slated to proceed on 19 October.

As St Oliver Plunketts lost their appeal to the Leinster Council, Na Fianna played St Vincent's in the semi final clash as planned. The game was initially scheduled for Friday 27 October 2006 but was cancelled and rescheduled for Monday 30 October to enable Ireland International Rules captain Kieran McGeeney to be available for the first test against Australia at Pearse Stadium.

Gary Mullins' appeal to the Disputes Resolution Authority
Gary Mullins also appealed to the Disputes Resolution Authority on 13 October 2006 to overturn a 12-week ban he received due to receiving a red card while playing for the Chicago Wolfe Tone's club at the North American Senior Football final in Philadelphia. He lost this appeal.

Kilmacud Crokes V Dublin County board dispute
The Dublin Championship was met with more scandal when Kilmacud Crokes postponed their game against UCD, stating that it was not within five days of their game against Lucan Sarsfields in the quarter final. This had the effect that Kilmacud had breached Rule 116 of the official guide. The GAC met Kilmacud representatives on 17 October to discuss the matter. The meeting of the GAC resulted in Kimacud Crokes being excluded from the Senior Club Football Championship.

UCD offered Kilmacud a replay thus reinstating Crokes, which would guarantee a Dublin representative in the Leinster Senior Club Football Championship. The semi final between the students and the Crokes was slated to take place on Thursday 26 October 2006. Kilmacud Crokes went on to play the game against the Students and were narrowly defeated, giving the Dublin Senior Football Championship its first finalist.

The winners of each semi final went on to the Dublin senior club football championship final. The losing teams were eliminated from the competition and there was no third and fourth-place games, therefore a loss would prove to be the respective teams final fixture in the Dublin championship.

Dublin Senior Club Football favourites Kilmacud Crokes crashed out of the Dublin championship to UCD in a tight game. UCD went on their first final since 2002. The 2006 final was a repeat of the 2002 final, as Na Fianna crashed out of the Dublin championship to northside rivals St Vincents. UCD won the 2002 final against St Vincents who were seeking to retain their first title since 1984.

Last 8

Dublin Senior Club Football Final
The teams for the final were selected from the following players:
UCD: S Gallagher, D Geraghty, P Navin, J McCarthy, M Duffy, E Cuiv, M Dunne, S Brady, J Sherry, B Sheehan, S Lennon, C Rogers, Colm Judge, A O'Malley, C O'Dwyer, J Kindergen, P McConway, C Fagan, M Ward, J Hanley, P Earls, N McNamee, K Doherty, B Quill, J Donoghue, W Minchin, B Mullin, P McNulty, F Canavan, E McHugh, J Tierney, B O hAnnaidh, N O'Connaughton, B Teehan, B Collins.

St Vincents: M Savage, W Lowry, E Brady, A Costello, P Conlon, G Brennan, R Fallon, P Gilroy, M Loftus, K Golden, N Dunne, T Doyle, D Connolly, T Diamond, T Quinn, E Somerville, J Calvert, C Hayes, J Moloney, B Manning, C Hayden, G Dent, S Loughlin, H Coughlan, A Stack, C Brady, R Brady, R Drumgoole.

UCD were crowned winners of the Dublin senior football championship and then went on to play in the Leinster Senior Club Football Championship against the Meath champions Wolfe Tones.

See also
 2006 Dublin Senior Hurling Championship

References

External links
The Dublin Senior Football Final
Stats of all games leading up to the final
Official Dublin Website
Dublin on Hoganstand
Dublin Club GAA
Reservoir Dubs

Dublin Senior Football Championship
Dublin Senior Football Championship